Albert Rieux (6 October 1914 - 15 April 1983) was a French stage and film actor.

Filmography

Cinema 
 1942 : Andorra ou les hommes d'airain, by Émile Couzinet as Nyerro
 1942 : La fausse maîtresse, by André Cayatte as Rigaux
 1943 : Le Brigand gentilhomme, by Émile Couzinet as Vicente
 1950 : The Girl from Maxim's, by Marcel Aboulker

Television 
 1974: Gil Blas de Santillane, TV serial created by Guy Kerner, Albert Rieux and Robert Vattier, directed by Jean-Roger Cadet

Theatre

Author 
 1958 : Gonzalo sent la violette by Albert Rieux and Robert Vattier, directed by Maurice Teynac, Théâtre Saint-Georges

Comedian 

 1950 : Les Maîtres Nageurs by Marcel Franck, directed by Émile Dars, Théâtre des Célestins  
 1952 : La Feuille de vigne by Jean Bernard-Luc, directed by Pierre Dux, Théâtre de la Madeleine
 1953 : La Feuille de vigne by Jean Bernard-Luc, directed by Pierre Dux, Théâtre des Célestins
 1953 : Le Voyageur sans bagage by Jean Anouilh, directed by Georges Pitoeff, Théâtre des Célestins
 1954 : La Maison de la nuit by Thierry Maulnier, directed by Marcelle Tassencourt & Michel Vitold, Théâtre des Célestins
 1955 : Affaire vous concernant by Jean-Pierre Conty, directed by Pierre Valde, Théâtre des Célestins
 1956 : La Tour de Nesle by  after Alexandre Dumas, directed by Jean Le Poulain, Théâtre des Mathurins in Paris
 1956 : La Femme du siècle by Claude Schnerb, directed by Jacques-Henri Duval, Théâtre des Célestins
 1957 : Marie Tudor by Victor Hugo, directed by Jean Vilar, Théâtre des Célestins
 1957 : Jupiter by Robert Boissy, directed by Jacques-Henri Duval, Théâtre des Célestins  
 1958 : La Mouche bleue by Marcel Aymé, directed by Claude Sainval, Théâtre des Célestins
 1959 : Ange le Bienheureux by Jean-Pierre Aumont, directed by Jacques Charon, Théâtre des Célestins
 1960 : Un ange qui passe by Pierre Brasseur, directed by de l'auteur, Théâtre des Célestins 
 1960 : Léocadia by Jean Anouilh, directed by Roland Piétri, Théâtre des Célestins
 1961 : The Condemned of Altona by Jean-Paul Sartre, directed by François Darbon, Théâtre des Célestins 
 1961 : Jean de la Lune by Marcel Achard, directed by Pierre Dux, Théâtre des Célestins
 1963 : Le Misanthrope by Molière, directed by Pierre Dux, Théâtre des Célestins
 1964 : Mon Faust by Paul Valéry, directed by Pierre Franck, Théâtre des Célestins
 1965 : Chat en poche by Georges Feydeau, directed by Jean-Laurent Cochet, Théâtre des Célestins, tournée Herbert-Karsenty
 1967 : Croque-monsieur by Marcel Mithois, directed by Jean-Pierre Grenier, Théâtre des Célestins
 1967 : Adorable Julia by Marc-Gilbert Sauvajon after Somerset Maugham, directed by Jean-Laurent Cochet, Théâtre des Célestins, tournée Herbert-Karsenty
 1968 : Fanny by Marcel Pagnol, directed by Henri Vilbert, Théâtre des Célestins
 1969 : Quoat-Quoat by Jacques Audiberti, mise scène Georges Vitaly, Théâtre des Célestins 
 1969 : Pygmalion by George Bernard Shaw, directed by Pierre Franck, Théâtre des Célestins
 1970 : A Flea in Her Ear by Georges Feydeau, directed by Jacques Charon, Théâtre des Célestins
 1971 : Croque-monsieur by Marcel Mithois, directed by Jean-Pierre Grenier, Théâtre des Célestins
 1971 : Une fille dans ma soupe by Terence Frisby, adaptation Marcel Moussy, Théâtre des Célestins
 1972 : Un sale égoïste by Françoise Dorin, directed by Michel Roux, Théâtre des Célestins
 1972 : Le Faiseur by Honoré de Balzac, directed by Pierre Franck, Théâtre Montansier, Théâtre des Célestins, tournée
 1976 : Le Médecin malgré lui by Molière, directed by Jean Meyer, Théâtre des Célestins, Théâtre de Boulogne-Billancourt
 1977 : Le Scénario by Jean Anouilh, directed by Jean Anouilh & Roland Piétri, Théâtre des Célestins, tournée Herbert-Karsenty
 1979 : Les Vignes du seigneur by Robert de Flers and Francis de Croisset, directed by Francis Joffo, Théâtre des Célestins

External links 
 
 Fiche-biographie: Albert Rieux sur Les Gens du Cinéma
 Les Archives du spectacle

French male stage actors
French male film actors
People from Albi
1914 births
1983 deaths